Hypsibarbus annamensis is a species of ray-finned fish in the genus Hypsibarbus. It was described in 1936 from specimens taken from the Huong River in central Vietnam, a river which enters the South China Sea at Huế. There have been no records since and the IUCN classify the fish as Data Deficient as more information is required to ensure the validity of the species, other speciemsn collected since the type specimen have proved to have been misidentifications.

Footnotes 

 

Annamensis
Fish described in 1936